Acta Odontologica Scandinavica is a peer-reviewed medical journal that covers dental research. The journal is published by Taylor and Francis Group and is sponsored by the Dental Associations and Dental Schools in Denmark, Finland, Iceland, Norway, and Sweden, with editorial responsibility alternating among these countries. The journal is currently edited by Palle Holmstrup (University of Copenhagen) and was established in 1939.

Abstracting and indexing 
According to the Journal Citation Reports, Acta Odontologica Scandinavicahas a 2021 impact factor of 2.232. It is published 8 times a year. In addition, it is abstracted and indexed in Biological Abstracts, Chemical Abstracts, Current Contents/Clinical Medicine, EMBASE/Excerpta Medica, Index Medicus/MEDLINE, and the Science Citation Index.

Article categories 
The journal publishes articles in the following categories:

 Original articles
 Case report
 Case series
 Solicited and unsolicited reviews
 Editorials
 Letters

References

External links 
 

dentistry journals
English-language journals
Taylor & Francis academic journals
Bimonthly journals
Publications established in 1939